The Kold Kage is the fifth album by saxophonist Gary Thomas recorded in 1991 and released on the JMT label.

Reception
The AllMusic review by Thom Jurek states, "Far from academic, this is fire-breathing music, one that forces not only confrontation but, from any open-minded music listener, a reexamination of the jazz terrain as a once, present, and future music."

Track listing
All compositions by Gary Thomas except as indicated
 "Threshold" - 6:59   
 "Gate of Faces" - 6:57   
 "Intellect" (Gary Thomas, Joe Wesson) - 7:09   
 "Infernal Machine" (Thomas, Wesson) - 6:58   
 "The Divide" - 7:25   
 "Peace of the Korridor" - 6:51   
 "First Strike" (Thomas, Wesson) - 7:18   
 "Beyond the Fall of Night" (Anthony Perkins) - 1:53   
 "The Kold Kage" (Thomas, Wesson) - 7:11   
 "Kulture Bandits (To Be Continued)" (Joe Lee, Gary Thomas) - 1:30

Personnel
Gary "GTX" Thomas  - tenor saxophone, flute, synthesizer, rap vocals
Joe "BMW" Wesson - rap vocals (tracks 3, 4 & 7)
Kevin Eubanks (tracks 1, 3 & 6) - guitar
Paul Bollenback (tracks 2 & 5) - guitar, guitar synthesizer
Michael Cain (tracks 1 & 6), Tim Murphy (tracks 8 & 9)  - piano, synthesizer
Mulgrew Miller - piano (tracks 2 & 7)
 Anthony Perkins - synthesizer (tracks 8 & 10)
Anthony Cox - bass 
Dennis Chambers - drums 
Steve Moss - percussion

References 

1991 albums
Gary Thomas (musician) albums
JMT Records albums
Winter & Winter Records albums